Pentathlon (released under the title as Super Athlete in the Philippines) is a 1994 American action film directed by Bruce Malmuth, who also wrote the screenplay with Gary DeVore and William Stadiem. The film stars Dolph Lundgren as an East German Olympic gold medalist pentathlete on the run from a lethal coach (David Soul). This was the last feature film appearance of director Bruce Malmuth, before his death on June 29, 2005.

Plot
After winning a gold medal for East Germany in the pentathlon in the 1988 Summer Olympics in Seoul, athlete Eric Brogar (Dolph Lundgren) flees from his abusive trainer, Heinrich Mueller (David Soul) and the Olympic team.

Eight years later, Mueller is no longer a trainer. He has become a neo-Nazi terrorist, responsible for a series of attacks on German government officials, and Mueller has discovered that Eric is in Los Angeles. Brogar had become a self-pitying boozehound until his talents were spotted by his diner-owning boss John Creese (Roger E. Mosley). Still smarting over Eric's defection, Mueller beats Eric's father Rudolph Brogar (Erik Holland) to death before flying to Los Angeles. While Eric reunites with his former girlfriend Julia Davis (Renee Coleman), who hones his endurance skills at her dad's woodland retreat, Mueller joins forces with neo-Nazi sympathizers including Eric's former rival Rhinehardt (Daniel Riordan).

At a peace rally, Mueller and his thugs plot to assassinate a rabbi and an ambassador while spreading a hate message on cable television. After viciously beating up Julia's father Vic Davis (Philip Bruns) and shooting Creese, Mueller and his thugs kidnap Eric, who retaliates by wiping out most of the neo-Nazis. Later, at another Olympic pentathlon finals, Eric not only triumphs, but he also ends up shooting Mueller dead in self-defense at the end when Mueller tries to kill him at the finish line.

Cast

Dolph Lundgren as Eric Brogar 
David Soul as Mueller
Renée Coleman as Julia
Roger E. Mosley as Creese
Evan James as Offerman
David Drummond as Hundt
Daniel Riordan as Rhinehardt
Philip Bruns as Vic
Gerald Hopkins as Christian
Erik Holland as Rudolph Brogar
Bruce Malmuth as Erhardt
Mel Stewart as Olympic Athlete
Anthony T. Pennello as Cop #1
Barry Lynch as Horst
Andreas Reinl as Schubert

Release

Theatrical
Pentathlon was released in the United States on July 8, 1994. In the Philippines, the film was released as Super Athlete by Jemah Films on October 19, 1994.

Reception

Critical response
Eoin Friel from The Action Elite gave Pentathlon 3.5 out of five stars. He praised for its originality, concluding: "Overall, If it’s wall to wall action you’re looking for then Pentathlon isn’t for you but if you’re willing to watch Dolph try something very different then it’s definitely worth a look." David Brook from Blue Print: Review gave the film three out of five stars, stating: "So, if you're a fan of cheesy 80's/90's action curios you'll probably find yourself buying into this film like I did, but if your mind ever stops to think about what you're watching you will see it for the ridiculous trash that it is." Anthony Nield from The Digital Fix gave "Pentathlon" 5 out 10, saying: "Pentathlon is an awful piece of filmmaking but that’s not to say it doesn’t entertain."

References

External links

1994 films
1994 action thriller films
1990s sports films
American films about revenge
American action thriller films
American sports drama films
Films about the 1988 Summer Olympics
Films about the 1996 Summer Olympics
Films directed by Bruce Malmuth
Films set in 1972
Films set in 1988
Films set in 1996
Films set in Berlin
Films set in East Germany
Films set in Germany
Films set in Leipzig
Films set in Los Angeles
Films set in Seoul
Films with screenplays by Gary DeVore
Modern pentathlon
1990s English-language films
1990s American films